Anatoly Ivanovich Kitov (9 August 1920, Samara - 14 October 2005) was a pioneer of cybernetics in the Soviet Union.

Biography

Early life 
The Kitov's family moved to Tashkent in 1921 as his father, Ivan Stepanovich Kitov, had served as a junior officer in White Army, and wished to avoid the negative consequences of this.[1] Here Anatoly did well at secondary school, gaining only excellent marks when he graduated in 1939. He immediately enrolled for the Tashkent State Technical University but was called up for military service almost immediately.[1] Whilst in the army his exceptional abilities brought him to the attention of Kliment Voroshilov who ordered him to enlist in the High Artillery School in Leningrad. In the end of June 1941 Kitov and his fellow students had to interrupt their learning and were urgently sent to the front. However Kitov was already an officer, a lieutenant. Later Kitov became a commander of the whole anti-aircraft battery, with 8 guns. Intervals between battles Anatoly Kitov filled with studying mathematics and other university subjects. In 1943 he performed his first analytic work, he proposed new method of anti aircraft shooting. That time he was at 22 years old.

Kitov's study of university subjects helped him gain in August 1945 entry to the F.E. Dzerzhinsky Artillery Academy  (one of the USSR best military universities) to the faculty of rocket armament, skipping the first academic year so as to start in the second.  A.I. Kitov was the chairman of scientific society of the academy's students. During his studying in the academy he himself was also working upon development of a rocket weapon of new type. The USSR State Committee on inventions awarded him an "Author’s certificate on the invention" (patent). His project proposal on new rocket-type weapon, among other perspective military inventions, was subsequently reported to I.V. Stalin – the Soviet Army supreme commander. Also at that period A.I. Kitov, still being a student of the academy, was involved in the work of S.P. Korolev's task force engaged in development of the Soviet missile R-1. In 1950, A. Kitrov graduated from the full course of the academy with honors and a gold medal.

Diversified scientific and organizational activity of Anatoly I. Kitov has the following 14 milestones in his biography:

Soviet military cybernetics initiatives

Kitov was the first who implemented for the usage of the first computer (the first soviet serial computer „Strela“) to the Military Ministry of the USSR. Kitov was the first in the USSR to organise and to head scientific work on solving military problems with the use of electronic computers. Those were calculations for General Staff of the USSR armed forces, for the Main Intelligence Directorate, for Main Directorate of the Land Forces, for Directorate of Support, etc. Already in the mid-fifties Kitov developed main principles of computer-based automated military-control and management systems for defence purposes. A big work was performed for implementing them in practical military usage. At the period between the years 1953 and 1963 Kitov issued the fundamental and first in the USSR, series of scientific articles on military informatics’ subjects. They were published by the journals "Military Thought", "Radioelectronics", "News of the F.E. Dzerzhisky Artillery Academy", also by periodical collections of works at the USSR Ministry of Defence and other "special" (classified) sources. In the Computer Center No 1 Ministry of Defense of the USSR Kitov was always the main initiator – „generator of ideas", who set up the problems and was „the brain" of their solution, and of the scientific projects in general". A. Kitov is the founder of Soviet military cybernetics.

First computer department in the USSR 

In 1952, A.I. Kitov founded and headed the first soviet "Department of Computers" at the Artillery Academy. Those time it was called a department of mathematical machines. Also, at 1952 A. Kitov created the USSR first scientific PhD dissertation on programming with the subject "Programming of the outer ballistics problems for the long range missiles". In 1953, A.I. Kitov published pioneer scientific article, on thirty pages, "Implementation and usage of electronic computers". That was the first article in the USSR on the subject. At 1954 A.I. Kitov founded  the first computer centre in the USSR. It was the Computer Centre No 1 of the USSR Ministry of Defence (CC No 1 MD USSR, secret number 01168) and he was the first header of it. In may, 1954 he was just 33, however enjoyed indisputable authority among his colleagues and subordinates.

Creation of the USSR anti-missile defense system 

Ballistic calculations for strategic rocket forces and for support of the first space flights took special place in the CC No.1 work. Description of the architecture of "M-100" became a part of A.I. Kitov's thesis for doctor's degree. The dissertation was titled "Implementation of Computers for solving the Problems of Antiaircraft and Antimissile Defence." He brilliantly defended it in 1963, at the "closed" (for authorised persons only) meeting of the Scientific Council of the Institute of Management Problems, AS USSR. Besides the "M-100", in his dissertation research Kitov has also analysed principles of designing specialised military computers. He defined specific features of their structure, algorithmic programming language for solving complex of anti-aerial defence problems with the use of computers, and performed computer modelling of dynamical systems connected with air defence systems demands.

Cybernetics science in the USSR

From 1948 to 1955, cybernetics was officially called bourgeois pseudoscience in the USSR. In 1951-1952 Kitov read the book Cybernetics by Norbert Wiener in English. He found this book in the library of the secret SKB-245. Kitov not only realized the scientific and social value of cybernetics, but also wrote the first positive article in the USSR, "The main features of cybernetics". It was very daring and could have ended with repressions for Kitov. After all, Joseph Stalin was still alive. But Kitov began the struggle for the recognition of cybernetics in the USSR. 
In 1953-1954 Kitov lectured on cybernetics in well-known Soviet organizations. Kitov invited the venerable scientists Sobolev and Lyapunov to become co-authors of his article "The Main Features of Cybernetics". The article was published in the journal Voprosy Filosofii (1955, No. 4) and for the first time presented the principles of cybernetics to the Soviet audience. The victory for cybernetics was bolstered by the publication two months later of Kitov's article "Technical Cybernetics" in the popular technical monthly "Radio". From 1955 to 1961, the scientific works of A.I. Kitov played a significant role in the recognition of cybernetics as a science and in its development in the USSR and other socialist countries.

New computers development 

At the CC No.1 A.I. Kitov headed and participated in design and manufacturing of two new computers - "M-100" and "Udar" (blow). Both were successfully put into operation. Computer "M-100" was processing data, which were received form surveillance radiolocation stations. "Udar" was used at preparing ballistic missiles for launching. Author's certificate for invention given to A.I. Kitov with his three colleagues with priority on 27 June 1958 for the principle of the parallel processing of instructions, . Created by Kitov this principle of statements parallel processing by the arithmetic device of computer, which is famous as "conveyor processing" is still in use by modern computers. Kitov proposed to implement this principle at the CC No 1, where it was used for new computer "M-100", which was developed under Kitov's guidance. That time it was the quickest lamp computer (first generation) in the USSR and in the world – one hundred thousand computer instructions per second. In "M-100" one of the first immediate access stores on ferrite cores were used.  Its two level addressing of Operating Memory Device (cash-memory) was important factor of increasing its performance. There were also some other principle novelties, but they were classified, as the whole project was a secret one. Special department of mathematical support had been established by Kitov for designing computer "M-100". Besides "M-100", in CC  No  1 for this computer was created a huge amount of software for processing information coming from radars of the Soviet anti-aircraft defence systems.

Writing on programming, computers and their applications 

The books by A.I. Kitov became a part of history of national science and university education as the first most complete sources on computer sciences, programming and automated management systems. Kitov was the author of the first soviet book (1956) and first soviet text-book (1959) on programming, computers and their applications. In common, he published 12 scientific books translated at 9 foreign languages. Kitov's books brought to general readers information and knowledge about the birth of new IT-branch.

Pioneering the automated management systems 

In his first soviet computer book Digital Electronic Machines (1956) Kitov published a big part „non-arithmetic usage of computers". Large chapter of this book is dedicated to usage of computers in economy, automation of production processes and at solving other intellectual problems. In his another book „Electronic Computing Machines", released in 1958, Kitov describes in details perspectives of complex automation in management, including management of industrial production and solving of economic problems. Anatoly Kitov is the author of the notion "automated management systems - AMS" and also of the philosophy of the Soviet "AMS". In his "Programming information and logic tasks" (1967) Kitov presents "Associative programming" technology – method for solving information-logical problems with large data-arrays processing. Programming language ALGEM, created under A.I. Kitov's scientific guidance, was described. ALGEM was used in the USSR and in the socialist countries of the East Europe. In his next book "Programming of economical and management tasks" A.I. Kitov generalised experience of his work as the chief designer of the Automated management system (AMS) for the Ministry of Radio-Industry. That system was recognised as the basic model for AMSes for the other nine Ministries of the USSR weapon industry. The book presented basic principles of creation automated management systems for the plants and industry.

Computer networking for the national economy management (project "Red book") 

A.I. Kitov was the first one to demonstrate necessity of creation of national automated system for management in the state economy and – simultaneously – in the armed forces, on basis of full-scale usage of electronic computers and mathematical methods. 
Clear understanding of the AMS development importance led Kitov, at the end of 1958, to the conclusion about necessity of automatisation of management of the national economy and also of its armed forces. The main point was, that this automated management system should be based on national network of regional computer centres (project "Red Book"). A.I. Kitov is famous for being the first one in the world who suggested project of a global integrated computer network for automated management of both the USSR national economy and the armed forces, functioning of which would be based on computers and mathematical methods.
He proposed that technological structure of that system would be a global, double purpose, computer network, covering the whole USSR territory. This network should consist of hundreds of computer centres maintained by specially qualified military personnel. In autumn of 1959 A.I. Kitov sent his second letter with his project of global computer network (the project "Red book") to the leader of USSR N.S. Khrushchev.

Information retrieval systems

Typical example of Kitov's scientific intuition consisted in his opinion on information retrieval systems. He aimed efforts of his CC No.1 scientists at their development. Creation of information retrieval systems became really "pioneer direction" not only for the USSR armed forces but for the whole Soviet IT as well. Anatoly Kitov initiated scientific works at the CC No.1 on the mathematical linguistics and machine translation. Kitov proposed to concentrate basic efforts not on direct increasing of performance, but first on development of methods, algorithms and programs which permitted to essentially extend processing, storage and retrieval semantic information.

Theory and practice of algorithmic programming languages

A. Kitov is the creator of two algorithmic programming languages - ALGEM and NORMIN. Compared with ALGOL-60, ALGEM was completed with new types of data, which made possible processing of not only numerical but also text-based information and data groups of various types. During a long time ALGEM was a "working horse" for the Soviet programmers, who were working in the field "non-arithmetical" applications of computers, it was also used in numerous
AMS of various levels implemented in industry and administrative management structures, both in the USSR and in the socialist countries.
In the 1970-s while working as the chief-designer of the AMS ‘Healthcare’, A.I. Kitov developed algorithmic programming language NORMIN, which was widely used in the USSR for programming medical problems. That was the first, in the USSR, query language for the information retrieval on formalised natural language. Taking under consideration that medical AMS would be used by the people, who did not have special technical education Kitov implemented special interface in his systems, which was convenient and easily understandable on intuition level as much as it was possible at the level of computer development of that time. The interface realised, among others, dialogue mode "human – computer" in normalised natural language NORMIN.

Computers unification and standardisation

Already in his letter to N.S. Khrushchev, from 07.01.1959, Kitov insisted that introduction of automated systems in the country should be conducted under supervision of the state administrator of high level – such as the member of the Political-Bureau of the Central Committee of the Communist Party. The whole work in the field of computation means and automated management systems should be subjected to a single body of the Soviet Union state level –special ministry- which would be granted the monopoly to coordinate, control and implement all developments and achievements of that branch. "Only such organisation will grant successful progress, rational, without time-delays or senseless chaotic actions". In his article ‘Computers – Assistants in each Thing’ from 12 July 1960, A.I. Kitov declares, that: "Taking under consideration exceptional importance of the computer development for the national economy and for the state defence, and also considering the fact that production of these computation means is steadily increasing, the need in centralised control over the work of computation centres of all kinds and categories and in control and coordination of usage of single computers, belonging to various organisations, is getting clear. These measures will enable the most rational usage of computers in interests of the whole country".
All that, Kitov wanted to perform on the whole national scale, and wrote about it in many of his articles. Unfortunately, all those ideas and proposals had not been heard and the bureaucratic machine was too slow.

Projects in medical cybernetics
A.I. Kitov has worked at Health Care and Medicine more than ten years. In the 1970s A.I. Kitov created for medical industry AMS "Health Care" and became a recognised leader in this field both in the USSR and abroad. Kitov managed to solve important scientific problems: information model of the soviet medical industry was created, unified software packages for forming and logical control of information arrays were worked out. In fact, during his "Medical period" A.I. Kitov started scientific research practically from the zero point and moved medical informatics of the USSR several tens of years ahead. Within the healthcare field he established scientific school, brought up number of talented followers, number of dissertation works were completed under his guidance. He also published several conceptual articles and three monographs: "Automation of Information processing and Management in the Healthcare
Field" (1976). "Introduction into Medical Cybernetics" (1977) and "Medical Cybernetics"(1983). A.I. Kitov made great contribution to creation of "local" medical AMSes, which functioned within specific enterprises – at hospitals, clinics, drugstores. The first AMS of that type operated at the clinical hospital No 6 subjected to the Third Directorate of the USSR Ministry of Health. Later this AMS supported a great deal of work at curing and rehabilitation of victims of Chernobyl power station catastrophe of 1986. Even there he managed to be a pioneer – the founder of soviet medical cybernetics.

During 12 years A.I. Kitov was the national representative of the USSR at influential organisations in the field of medical informatics at the United Nations and the UNESCO: • International Federation of medical informatics: (MedINFO). • International Medical Informatics Association: Officer of IMIA. • Technical Committee No4 of International Federation for Information Processing (TC-4 IFIP).
He participated in organization of three international congresses Med-INFO: Ist World Congress of MedINFO – 1974 (Stokholm), IInd World Congress of MedINFO – 1977 (Toronto), IIIrd World Congress of MedINFO – 1980 (Tokyo). A.I. Kitov at these congresses was the member of Organizing Committee and Programm Committee. About a thousand scientists from developed countries gathered at MedINFO-1977. A.I. Kitov was a chairman of the section on biomedical researches (Session T2 – «BIOMEDICAL RESEARCH GENERAL»).

Pedagogical activity

Pedagogical activity took important place in A.I. Kitov's work. As it is clearly visible from his biography, he had born interest for acquiring knowledge and their dissemination; passing them to those who surrounded him. For great many of IT specialists A.I. Kitov is famous, first of all, as the author of the first soviet books and textbooks on computing and programming. Else at the 1951–1952, at the Artillery Academy name F.E.  Dzerzhinsky A.I. Kitov conducted one of the three, first in the USSR, courses of lectures on computers and programming. More than 40 post graduates, both Soviet and foreign, prepared and defended dissertations under Kitov's scientific supervision. In 1980, when A.I. Kitov already had rich experience of scientific work and of teaching, he received position at the Russian G.V. Plekhanov University of Economics, where he worked during seventeen years. He headed the chair of „Computer Engineering and Programming".

Bibliography 
Kitov A.I. Candidate dissertation (PhD thesis). "Programming of exterior ballistics for long-range rockets". Scientific Research Institute (SRI) – 4 USSR Ministry of Defence (MD USSR), 1952. P. 280.
Kitov A.I. Application of Electronic Computers // News of F.E. Dzerzhinsky Academy, 1953. P. 30.
Sobolev S.L., Kitov A.I., Lyapunov A.A. Main Traits of Cybernetics // "Problems of Philosophy". 1955. No 4. P. 136–148.
Kitov A.I. Technical cybernetics // "Radio". 1955. No 11. P. 42–44.
Kitov A.I. Electronic Digital Computers. М.: "Sovetskoe Radio", 1956. P. 358.
Kitov A.I. Significance of electronic computers for military field // "Radioelektronika". 1956. No 12. P.
Kitov A.I. Electronic computers and their military applications // "Voennaya mysl" (military thought). 1956. No 7. P. 25–35.
Kitov A.I. Electronic Computers // Radio-engineering and electronics and their technical applications // Under editorship of academician A.I. Berg and prof. I.S. Dzhigit М.: published by the USSR Academy of Sciences (AS USSR), 1956. P. 106–114.
Kitov A.I., Krinitsky N.A., Komolov P.N. Elements of programming (for digital electronic computers) / Under edition of A.I. Kitov. М.: published by the F.E. Dzerzhinsky Artillery Academy, 1956. P. 288.
Kitov A.I. Mathematics in military field // "Voennaya mysl". 1958. No 6. P. 3–16.
Kitov A.I. Electronic computers. М.: "Znanie". 1958. P. 31.
Kitov A.I., Krinitsky N.A. Electronic computers. М.: "Nauka" (Science), 1958. P. 130; second – revised and enlarged – edition. М.: "Nauka", 1965. P. 176.
Kitov A.I., Krinitsky N.A. Electronic computers. М.: "Nauka" (Science), 1958. P. 130; 2nd – revised and enlarged – edition. М.: "Nauka", 1965. P. 176.
Kitov A.I., Mylnikov M.V. Shuvalov A.I., Seleznev O.V. Author's Certificate on special subject No 19628 from 6 May 1959. The State Committee of the USSR Council of Ministers on Inventions and Discoveries.
Kitov A.I. Computing – assistant in each activity // Daily "Izvestia". 12 July 1960. P. 4
Kitov A.I. Cybernetics and management of the national economy // "Cybernetics – to serve communism" (scientific-popular series) Collection of works under edition of academician A.I. Berg. Vol. 1. М.- L.: "Gosenergoizdat", 1961. P. 203–218.
Kitov A.I. Cybernetics in national economy management // Daily paper "Ekonomicheskaya gazeta". 28 August 1961. No 4. P. 9–11.
Kitov A., Krinitskii N. Electronic computers. Oxford, London, New York, Paris: Pergamon Press, 1962. viii+112 p. (International Series of Monographs on Electronics and Instrumentation. Vol. 13.
Kitov A.I. Cybernetics // Encyclopaedic dictionary of physics. Edition in five volumes. Vol. 2. М.: "Sovetskaya Encyclopedia", 1962. P. 357–362.
Berg A.I., Kitov A.I., Lyapunov A.A. On the Possibilities of the Automation of Control in the National Economy // Soviet Computer Technology. Problems in Cybernetics. vol. 6. Translated from the Russian by Wade Holland. RAND Corporation. Memorandum RM-2919/17-PR. February 1963. P. 83–100.
Kitov A.I. Cybernetics // Production automation and industrial electronics. Vol. 2. М.: "Sovetskaya Entsiclopedia". 1963. P. 24–36
Kitov A.I. Programming of information-logical problems. М.: "Sovetskoe Radio", 1967. P. 327.
Kitov A.I. Programming of economic and management problems. М.: "Sovetskoe Radio", 1971. P. 370.
Kitov A.I. Fundamental principles of designing information retrieval systems for medical field // Digital computers and programming. Issue 6. М.: "*Radio", 1971. P. 17–31.
Kitov A.I. ALGEM // Encyclopaedia of Cybernetics. Vol. 1. Kiev: "Ukrainian Soviet Encyclopaedia", 1974. P. 108
Vorobyov E.I., Kitov A.I. Automation of management and information processing in healthcare. М.: "Sovetskoe Radio", 1976. P. 134.
Kitov A.I. Fundamental principles of composing documental-factographic information-retrieval system // Algorithms and organisation of economic problems solution. Issue 7. М.: "Statistika", 1976. P. 14–25.
Vorobyov E.I., Kitov A.I. Introduction in medical cybernetics. М.: "Meditsina", 1977. P. 288.
Kitov A.I., Budko N.N. Normalize language of medical information "NORMIN" // Problems of Informational Theory and Practice. No 33. М.: (ВИНИТИ / VINITI), 1978. P. 64–77.
Vorobyov E.I., Kitov A.I. Medical cybernetics. М.: "Radio I Svyaz’", 1983. P. 240.
Kitov A.I. Problems of automated management systems creation for national economy // Collection of reports. (МДНТП). М., 1967. P. 16.
Kitov A.I. (Chief designer of the AMS), Glushkov V.M. (Scientific supervisor of the AMS). Pilot project of standard automated informati on-management system for industry branch. M.: Ministry of Radio-Industry USSR, 1967. P. 150.
Kitov A.I. (Scientific supervisor). User’s manual on the system of economic-mathematical problems programming automation ALGEM-ST-2. М.: USSR (MRI) and USSR (CSD), 1968. 9 p.
Kitov A.I. Automated information-management system for industry branch// Collection of works of the State Committee on Science and Engineering (SCSE). М.: (SCSE), 1970. P. 24
Kitov A.I. (Chief designer). Technical and operation projects AMS «Healthcare». М.: The 3rd Main Directorate of the USSR Ministry of Healthcare, 1975. P. 100.
Kitov A.I. Computers, Informatics and Biomedical research // Proceedings of the 2nd International Conference on medical Informatics «MEDINFO – 77», Toronto, 1977.
Kitov A.I. (Chief designer). Technical project of AMS for the 3rd Main Directorate of the USSR Ministry of Healthcare. The 3rd Main Directorate of the USSR Ministry of Healthcare // Institute of Biophysics, 1978. P. 80.

Recognition 
 Kitov Anatoliy Ivanovich at Virtual Russian Computer museum
 Benjamin Peters «How not to network a Nation: the Uneasy History of the Soviet Internet». The MIT Press (Cambridge, Massachusetts & London, England), 2016, 298 p. 
 Gerovitch S. InterNyet: Why the Soviet Union Did Not Build a Nationwide Computer Network // History and Technology. 2008. Vol. 24. P. 335–350.
  From cybernetics and automated management systems to digital economics : On the occasion of the centenary of A. I. Kitov birth
 Kitov V.A., Shilov V.V., Silantiev S.A.: Trente ans ou la vie d’un scientifique. IFIP Advances in Information and Communication Technology, vol. 487, pp. 186–202 (2016).
 Kitov V.A., Shilov V.V., Silantiev S.A.: Anatoly Kitov and ALGEM algorithmic language. In: AISB/IACAP World Congress 2012: Symposium on the History and Philosophy of Programming, Part of Alan Turing Year 2012 (2012).
 V.A.Kitov, V.V.Shilov  Anatoly Kitov: Technology vs. Ideology. The story about first project of nationwide computer network // The Second Region 8 IEEE Conference on the History of Telecommunications. SESSION III. PIONEERS OF ELECTRO-TECHNOLOGY. Madrid (Spain), 2010
 Gerovitch, Slava. From Newspeak to Cyberspeak. A History of Soviet Cybernetics. Cambridge, MA: The MIT Press 2002.– 378 p.
 Yannick Harrel "La Cyber Strategie Russe". NUVIS (Paris, France), 2015, 246 p.
 Gerovitch, Slava. «Mathematical Machines» of the Cold War: Soviet Computing, American Cybernetics and Ideological Disputes in the Early 1950s // Social Studies of Science. April 2001. Vol. 31.– P. 253–287.
 Gerovitch, Slava. «Russian Scandals»: Soviet Readings of American Cybernetics in the Early Years of the Cold War // Russian Review. October 2001. Vol. 60.– P. 545–568.

References

External links 
 Full biography of Anatoly Ivanovich Kitov
 Review of Kitov's selected publications
 Documentary film "The Internet of colonel Kitov"

1920 births
2005 deaths
Soviet cyberneticists